"Rusty Chevrolet" is a song by American novelty music band Da Yoopers. The song was released in 1986 and can be found on the band's second album Culture Shock. It is a novelty Christmas song set to the melody of "Jingle Bells".

History
Da Yoopers released "Rusty Chevrolet" in late 1986 following their first album Yoopanese. Band members Jim DeCaire and Joe Potila wrote and produced the song. It was issued as a single with "Smeltin' USA" on the B-side, and later appeared on the band's second album Culture Shock. At the time of its release, the band sold copies of the single for two dollars, with half of that amount being donated to the local Salvation Army. After its release, the song became popular on stations in the Upper Peninsula of Michigan and in Wisconsin, with WIFC of Wausau, Wisconsin alone ordering over 200 copies due to listener demand.

The band later used profits from the song to build their own recording studio in their hometown of Ishpeming, Michigan.

"Rusty Chevrolet" is about a man's struggles with his old Chevrolet car, and its lyrics are set to the melody of the Christmas song "Jingle Bells".

References

1986 songs
American Christmas songs
Songs about cars
Songs about Michigan
Novelty songs